The following lists events that happened in 1952 in Iceland.

Incumbents
President – Sveinn Björnsson, Ásgeir Ásgeirsson
Prime Minister – Steingrímur Steinþórsson

Events

Births

14 January – Teitur Thordarson, footballer
11 March – Sólveig Pétursdóttir, politician.
15 June – Sigurjón Sighvatsson, film producer.
28 September – Hallgerður Gísladóttir, ethnologist and poet (d. 2007)
3 November – Ingi Björn Albertsson, footballer

Deaths

25 January – Sveinn Björnsson, first President of the Republic of Iceland (1944–1952) (b. 1881)

References

 
1950s in Iceland
Iceland
Iceland
Years of the 20th century in Iceland